Eric Harry Timothy Mabius (born April 22, 1971) is an American actor. Born in Harrisburg, Pennsylvania, he graduated from Sarah Lawrence College in Bronxville, New York, with a degree in cinema studies. After working in theater productions, Mabius made his film debut in the 1995 independent dark comedy Welcome to the Dollhouse.
Mabius gained widespread recognition for his role as Daniel Meade on the ABC comedy-drama series Ugly Betty. He also appeared on the Showtime series The L Word and in the films Cruel Intentions, The Crow: Salvation, and Resident Evil.

Life
Mabius was born in Harrisburg, Pennsylvania, the son of Elizabeth (née Dziczek) and Craig Mabius. His father worked as a historian preserving the Historic Allaire Village. He has a brother, Craig. Mabius is Catholic. After attending Amherst Regional High School in Amherst, Massachusetts, where he was voted "Most Dramatic Girly" as a senior, he enrolled in Sarah Lawrence College in Yonkers, New York, where he pursued his education in film theory.

Mabius wed Ivy Sherman, an interior designer, in January 2006; the two first met in high school during a health education class.

Career
Mabius began his career with roles in Welcome to the Dollhouse (1995), I Shot Andy Warhol (1996), and Black Circle Boys (1997). He was involved with The Crow superhero franchise on more than one occasion: he auditioned for a role as one of Top Dollar's henchmen in the 1994 original The Crow and played Alex Corvis in The Crow: Salvation (2000), the third installment, opposite Kirsten Dunst. He was in Cruel Intentions (1999) alongside Sarah Michelle Gellar and Ryan Phillippe. He also played an activist named Matt Addison in 2002's Resident Evil.

In television, Mabius has appeared on Chicago Hope, Millennium, Popular, The O.C., and the short-lived series Eyes (2005). He was a regular cast member of The L Word in its first season and returned for one episode in each of the second, third, and sixth seasons, portraying Tim Haspel. He also guest-starred on an episode of CSI: Miami. From 2006 to 2010, he starred as fashion magazine editor Daniel Meade on the ABC dramedy series Ugly Betty. After the success of Ugly Betty, he was included on People magazine's "Sexiest Men Alive" list in 2006. Mabius also appeared in the 2006 Lifetime original film A Christmas Wedding, and had a leading role in the 2011 British science-fiction drama series Outcasts. 

In 2013, Mabius guest-starred in a season 2 episode of Scandal. The same year he was cast as the lead in Hallmark Channel's Signed, Sealed, Delivered film series.

Honors
Mabius competed as a luger in the late 1980s and was named an honorary captain for the US luge team for the 2010 Winter Olympics along with astronaut Scott Parazynski.

Filmography

Film

Television

Awards and nominations

References

External links

 

1971 births
20th-century American male actors
21st-century American male actors
Actors from Harrisburg, Pennsylvania
American male film actors
American male lugers
American male television actors
American people of Austrian descent
American people of Irish descent
American people of Polish descent
Living people
Male actors from Pennsylvania
People from Topanga, California
Sarah Lawrence College alumni
Amherst Regional High School (Massachusetts) alumni